Moitrelia is a genus of snout moths.

Species
Moitrelia boeticella (Ragonot, 1887)
Moitrelia hispanella Staudinger, 1859
Moitrelia italogallicella (Milliere, 1882)
Moitrelia obductella (Zeller, 1839)
Moitrelia thymiella (Zeller, 1846)

References

Phycitini
Pyralidae genera